Igor Manojlović (born 30 March 1977) is a Serbian football player-manager.

Career
In the summer of 1998, Manojlović was signed by FR Yugoslavia champions Obilić, but failed to make an impact. He later went abroad and won the Liechtenstein Cup with FC Vaduz in the 2004–05 season, as well as with USV Eschen/Mauren in the 2011–12 season.

Honours
FC Vaduz
 Liechtenstein Cup: 2004–05
USV Eschen/Mauren
 Liechtenstein Cup: 2011–12

References

External links
 
 

1977 births
Living people
Footballers from Belgrade
Serbia and Montenegro footballers
Serbian footballers
Association football defenders
FK Radnički Beograd players
FK Obilić players
FK Radnički Niš players
FK Milicionar players
FK Radnički Obrenovac players
FC Vaduz players
FC Chur 97 players
SC Schwanenstadt players
USV Eschen/Mauren players
FC Triesen players
First League of Serbia and Montenegro players
Second League of Serbia and Montenegro players
Serbia and Montenegro expatriate footballers
Serbian expatriate footballers
Expatriate footballers in Liechtenstein
Expatriate footballers in Switzerland
Expatriate footballers in Austria
Serbia and Montenegro expatriate sportspeople in Switzerland
Serbia and Montenegro expatriate sportspeople in Austria
Serbian expatriate sportspeople in Austria
Serbian expatriate sportspeople in Liechtenstein
Serbian expatriate sportspeople in Switzerland
Serbian football managers
Association football player-managers